Matthew Lynch (29 November 1916 – 3 September 1999) was a Scottish footballer who played for Celtic and Dumbarton.

References

1916 births
Scottish footballers
Dumbarton F.C. players
Celtic F.C. players
Scottish Football League players
1999 deaths
Association football wing halves